Fairfield Plantation may refer to:

 Fairfield Plantation, Georgia, a census-designated place
 Fairfield Plantation (Charleston County, South Carolina)
 Fairfield Plantation (Gloucester County, Virginia)